Undercard is an album by indie-rock band The Extra Lens, a band made up John Darnielle and Franklin Bruno. The album was released on October 19, 2010.

Production
Darnielle recorded his parts, after which Bruno added more instrumentation.

Reception
Reception to Undercard was generally positive, according to review aggregator Metacritic.

PopMatters wrote that "not all of the compositions here reach their potential, but Bruno almost consistently nails his efforts to create the right mood for Darnielle’s storytelling."

Track listing
 "Adultery"
 "Cruiserweights"
 "Only Existing Footage"
 "Communicating Doors"
 "Programmed Cell Death"
 "How I Left the Ministry"
 "Some Other Way"
 "Ambivalent Landscape Z"
 "In Germany Before the War" (Randy Newman cover)
 "Tug on the Line"
 "Rockin’ Rockin’ Twilight of the Gods"
 "Dogs of Clinic 17"

References

2010 albums
Merge Records albums